Boronia barrettiorum is a plant in the citrus family Rutaceae and is only known from two populations growing north of the Prince Regent River in the Kimberley Australia region of Western Australia. It is an erect, open shrub with hairy branches and leaves, simple or trifoliate leaves and white, four-petalled flowers.

Description
The leaves are simple and trifoliate on a single branch. The sepals are only slightly smaller than, or larger than the petals.

Taxonomy and naming
The specific epithet (barrettiorum) honours Matt and Russell Barrett who were the first to collect this species.

Distribution and habitat

Conservation
Boronia barrettiorum is classified as "Priority Two" by the Western Australian Government Department of Parks and Wildlife meaning that it is poorly known and from only one or a few locations.

References 

barrettiorum 
Flora of Western Australia
Plants described in 2006
Taxa named by Marco Duretto